Dalian Ocean University (Dalian Fisheries University before 2010) is a university in Dalian, China. Founded in 1952, it is the sole university featuring fisheries science courses in northern China.  Over 7,000 students are enrolled.

External links
Official home page

Universities and colleges in Dalian
Maritime colleges in China
Educational institutions established in 1952
1952 establishments in China